Mar Jacques-Eugene Manna  (Syriac ܝܥܩܘܒ ܐܘܓܝܢ ܡܢܢܐ "Yaqub Augin Manna") was bishop of the Chaldean Catholic Church.

Life
He was born in 1867 in Baqofah in Ninveh province in northern Iraq. He was ordained priest on August 15, 1889 by Mar Eliya XIV [XIII] Abulyonan and then consecrated bishop in 1902 until in his mysterious disappearance in February 1928 when several days later his body was found in the Tigris river.

publications
 Chaldean(Aramaic)-Arabic Dictionary: Mosul 1900.
 A Grammar of the Aramaic Language: Mosul 1896.
 A Collection of Syriac Literature: Mosul 1901.

External links
 The Hierarchy of the Catholic Church

Iraqi archbishops
Chaldean archbishops
Iraqi Eastern Catholics
1867 births
1928 deaths
People from Nineveh Governorate
Iraqi Assyrian people
20th-century Eastern Catholic archbishops
20th-century Iraqi writers
Syriac writers